Yamnoye is a rural locality (a selo) in Mayachninsky Selsoviet, Ikryaninsky District, Astrakhan Oblast, Russia. The population was 461 as of 2010. There are 11 streets.

Geography 
Yamnoye is located 15 km south of Ikryanoye (the district's administrative centre) by road. Mayachnoye is the nearest rural locality.

References 

Rural localities in Ikryaninsky District